Isopogon cuneatus, commonly known as coneflower, is a species of plant in the family Proteaceae and is endemic to the south-west of Western Australia. It is a shrub with oblong to egg-shaped leaves with the narrower end towards the base, and flattened-spherical heads of glabrous pale to purplish pink flowers.

Description

Taxonomy
Isopogon cuneatus was first formally described in 1810 by Robert Brown in the Transactions of the Linnean Society of London.

Distribution and habitat
Coneflower grows in heath, shrubland and low woodland on stony hills and swampy flats between Albany, the Stirling Range and Cheyne Bay in the Esperance Plains, Jarrah Forest and Warren biogeographic regions.

References

cuneatus
Eudicots of Western Australia
Endemic flora of Western Australia
Plants described in 1810
Taxa named by Robert Brown (botanist, born 1773)